"Biding My Time" is a composition by Pink Floyd bassist Roger Waters.

Prior performance and recording
Prior to the Relics compilation album, "Biding My Time" was an unreleased recording, heard only by fans who attended concerts where the band performed their early concept piece, The Man and The Journey, where the song appeared as "Afternoon". During the song a trombone can be heard which is played by keyboardist Rick Wright. The lyrics talk about the narrator spending his time with a woman he loves and forgetting the "bad days" when they were both  "workin' from nine to five".

Personnel 
Roger Waters – double-tracked lead vocals, bass guitar 
David Gilmour – acoustic and electric guitars
Richard Wright – piano, trombone, Hammond organ
Nick Mason – drums, percussion

References 

1969 songs
Pink Floyd songs
Jazz songs
Songs written by Roger Waters
Blues rock songs